The 2021 Duke Blue Devils men's soccer team represented Duke University during the 2021 NCAA Division I men's soccer season.  The Blue Devils were led by head coach John Kerr, in his fourteenth season.  They played their home games at Koskinen Stadium.  The team was founded in 1935 and currently plays in the Atlantic Coast Conference.

The Blue Devils finished the season 14–5–1 overall and 5–2–1 in ACC play to finish in a tie for first place in the Coastal Division.  As the third overall seed in the ACC Tournament, the received a bye into the Quarterfinals where they defeated Wake Forest and then defeated Clemson in the Semifinals.  They fell in the final to Notre Dame.  They received an at-large bid to the NCAA Tournament and were awarded the seventh seed.  Being a seeded team, they received a bye into the Second Round where they defeated UCLA before losing to tenth seeded Saint Louis in the Third Round.

Background

The teams' 2020 season was significantly impacted by the COVID-19 pandemic, which curtailed the fall season and caused the NCAA Tournament to be played in Spring 2021. The ACC was one of the only two conferences in men's soccer to play in the fall of 2020.  The ACC also held a mini-season during the spring of 2021.

The Blue Devils finished the fall season 2–6–0 and 2–4–0 in ACC play to finish in fourth place in the South Division.  In the ACC Tournament they lost to Pittsburgh in the Quarterfinals.  They finished the spring season 2–4–3 and 2–3–1 in ACC play, to finish in third place in the Coastal Division.  They were not invited to the NCAA Tournament.

Player movement

Players leaving

Players arriving 

Duke signed seven players during the 2021 recruiting period.

Squad

Roster

Team management

Source:

Schedule 
Source:

|-
!colspan=6 style=""| Exhibition

|-
!colspan=6 style=""| Regular season

|-
!colspan=6 style=""| ACC Tournament

|-
!colspan=6 style=""| NCAA Tournament

Awards and honors

2022 MLS Super Draft

Source:

Rankings

References

2021
Duke Blue Devils
Duke Blue Devils
Duke Blue Devils men's soccer
Duke